Dennis Emery (4 October 1933 – 1 May 1986) was an English professional footballer who made 311 appearances and scored 229 goals as an inside forward for Peterborough United. Emery is a member of the club's Hall of Fame and in a Football League 125th anniversary poll was voted by the Peterborough United supporters as the club's second best-ever player.

Career statistics

Honours 
Peterborough United

 Midland League (5): 1955–56, 1956–57, 1957–58, 1958–59, 1959–60
 Football League Fourth Division (1): 1960–61

Individual

 Peterborough United Hall of Fame

References

1933 births
1986 deaths
English footballers
English Football League players
Eynesbury Rovers F.C. players
Peterborough United F.C. players
Southern Football League players
Bedford Town F.C. players
Footballers from Bedfordshire
People from Sandy, Bedfordshire
Association football inside forwards